The Legio XX Siciliana, the twentieth Sicilian legion, was a legion in the Roman army of the late Republic and the Imperial Roman army.

History 
The legion was stationed in Hispania Tarraconensis from 25 to 13 BCE. The legion was in Sicilia and Pannonia in 6 BCE. It was disbanded in 41 BCE. Although, in 36 BCE the legion was reassembled for a campaign in Sicily.

Attested members

See also
List of Roman legions

References 

20 Siciliana